As of the late 1980s, Nigeria considered France its primary rival in its attempt to chart the course of West Africa's political development. Its generally paternalistic relations with Chad intensified after the coup that ousted President François Tombalbaye in 1975. After that, limiting Libyan expansion while avoiding direct clashes with Libyan troops also became important goals. Nigeria sponsored talks among Chad's rival factions in 1979 and promoted a little-known civil servant, Mahmat Shawa Lol, as a compromise head of a coalition government. Lol's perceived status as a Nigerian puppet contributed to mounting opposition during his short term as president in 1979.

The two nations forged stronger ties during the 1980s. Hoping to benefit commercially and diplomatically by expanding regional trade relations, Nigeria replaced France as Chad's major source of export revenues. Bilateral trade agreements involved Chadian exports of livestock, dried fish, and chemicals and imports of Nigerian foodstuffs and manufactured goods. Both governments also recognized the potential value of the large informal trade sector across their borders, which neither country regulated. In addition, Nigerian industry and commerce employed several thousand Chadian workers. Both nations have seats on the United Nations Security Council.

Chad's relationship with Nigeria was not without its strains, however. Beginning in the late 1970s, clashes occurred around Lake Chad, where both countries hoped to exploit oil reserves. Both also sought to defuse these confrontations, first by establishing joint patrols and a commission to demarcate the boundary across the lake more clearly. Then in the early 1980s, the low level of Lake Chad brought a series of tiny islands into view, leading to further disputes and disrupting long-standing informal trade networks.

This relationship was also complicated by Nigeria's own instability in the north, generated by rising Islamic fundamentalism. Thousands of casualties occurred as the result of violent clashes in Nigeria throughout the 1980s. Most religious violence was domestic in origin, but Nigerian police arrested a few Libyans, and Nigerian apprehension of Libyan infiltration through Chad intensified.

Nigeria's 1983 economic austerity campaign also produced strains with neighboring states, including Chad. Nigeria expelled several hundred thousand foreign workers, mostly from its oil industry, which faced drastic cuts as a result of declining world oil prices. At least 30,000 of those expelled were Chadians. Despite these strains, however, Nigerians had assisted in the halting process of achieving stability in Chad, and both nations reaffirmed their intention to maintain close ties.

Cooperation on fighting Boko Haram 
In May 2014, in the wake of the Chibok schoolgirl kidnapping, 
Chad's minister of national defense, Benaindo Tatola, met with Cameroon's defense minister Edgard Allain Mebe Ngo'o in Yaounde. "Ngo'o said Chad had also deployed troops to work together with Cameroonian forces on the borders with Nigeria. He also said troops from the two countries will cross into Nigeria and fight Boko Haram in collaboration with Nigerian forces."

See also 
 Foreign relations of Chad
 Foreign relations of Nigeria

References

Further reading
Omede, Nigeria's relationship with its neignbours, 2006

 
Nigeria
Bilateral relations of Nigeria